, known as , is a Japanese transgender actress who is represented by the talent agency Office Carrousel.

Filmography

Dramas

Variety

Films

References

External links
  

Japanese LGBT actors
Transgender actresses
1942 births
Living people
Actors from Hokkaido
People from Kushiro, Hokkaido